The dashtail barb (Enteromius poechii) is a species of cyprinid fish in the genus Enteromius which is found in the rivers of western central Africa from Zimbabwe and Namibia north to the Democratic Republic of the Congo.

References 

 

Enteromius
Cyprinid fish of Africa
Fish described in 1911
Taxa named by Franz Steindachner